Nangkhor  is a town in south-eastern Bhutan. It is located in Pemagatshel District.

Population 672 (2005 census).

References

Populated places in Bhutan